The eighth season of the Ukrainian competitive reality television series MasterChef Ukraine premiered on August 28, 2018 on STB.

Contestants

Top 20

Elimination table

Key

Episodes

Episode 1-2
Original airdate: 

Casting for the top 50.

Episode 3-4
Original airdate: 

50 semi-finalists were narrowed down to the top 20.

Episode 5-6
Original airdate: 

Team challenge 1: Relay. Each member of the team takes turns preparing their portion of the dish. Bottom: Daryna T, Dmytro, Vladyslav M, Mykhailo.
Team challenge 2: Conveyor. The captain and assistant make a dish from the dough, remaining team must guess and cook it right. Bottom: Ivan, Vladyslav K.
Team challenge 3: Street Food. The team should cook and sell their dishes to tourists on the Andriyivskyy Descent. Bottom: Serzhik.
Black apron challenge: Each participant must prepare 4 dishes from the ingredients which his opponent will give him. Eliminated: Mykhailo

Episode 7-8
Original airdate: 
Eliminated: Dmytro

References

2018 Ukrainian television seasons